Biography is a greatest hits compilation album by Irish Celtic rock band Horslips. The first disc comprises each of the band's singles that were released in the UK.  The second comprises the B-sides to each of those singles, some of which have never been released on CD before.  The album was released on 1 November 2013, to coincide with the release of the book Tall Tales: The Official Biography of Horslips.

Track listing

Personnel 
Horslips
 Eamon Carr – drums, bodhrán, percussions
 Barry Devlin – bass guitar, vocals
 Johnny Fean – guitars, banjo, vocals
 Jim Lockhart – keyboards, flute, tin whistles, uilleann pipes, vocals
 Charles O'Connor – fiddle, mandolin, concertina, vocals

References 

Horslips albums
2013 greatest hits albums